To Cut a Long Story Short is a 2000 short story collection by British writer and politician Jeffrey Archer.  Unlike his previous collections, which have contained 12 stories, this one has 15.  A list of the featured stories is below.

Death Speaks (from W. Somerset Maugham's Sheppey)
The Expert Witness
The Endgame
The Letter
Crime Pays
Chalk and Cheese
A Change of Heart
Too Many Coincidences
Love At First Sight
Both Sides Against The Middle
A Weekend to Remember
Something for Nothing
Other Blighters' Efforts
The Reclining Woman
The Grass is Always Greener . . .

References 

Archer, Jeffrey: To Cut a Long Story Short

External links 
 

Short story collections by Jeffrey Archer
2000 short story collections
HarperCollins books